Vittorio Lucarelli (31 October 1928 – 16 February 2008) was an Italian fencer. He won a gold medal in the team foil event at the 1956 Summer Olympics.

References

External links
 

1928 births
2008 deaths
Italian male foil fencers
Olympic fencers of Italy
Fencers at the 1956 Summer Olympics
Olympic gold medalists for Italy
Olympic medalists in fencing
Fencers from Rome
Medalists at the 1956 Summer Olympics